Little River is a  long tributary to the Eno River in Durham County, North Carolina.  Little River along with the Flat River are the major tributaries to the Eno River before it enters Falls Lake.

Both the North Fork of Little River and the South Fork begin in northern Orange County, North Carolina near Hurdle Mills Road. The South and North Forks come together in a confluence near Guess Road and South Lowell Road in northern Durham County. 5.5 miles southeast of the confluence, the Little River is dammed to form the Little River Reservoir, a drinking water source for the City of Durham. The damming of the river in 1983 flooded a significant portion of the historic community of Orange Factory.

References

Rivers of Durham County, North Carolina
Rivers of North Carolina
Tributaries of Pamlico Sound